Hanna D. - The Girl from Vondel Park, is a 1984  erotic drama film directed by Rino Di Silvestro. Bruno Mattei completed the film.

Plot
Hanna is a poor girl abandoned to herself and forced to prostitute on the streets to obtain her drug fix from unscrupulous people like Miguel. But one day she meets Alex, who falls for her and helps her return to a normal life.

Cast

 Ann-Gisel Glass as Hanna
 Tony Serrano as Miguel
 Sebastiano Somma as Alex
 Donatella Damiani 
 Jacques Stany 
 Georges Millon  
 Fausto Lombardi
 Karin Schubert as Hanna's Mother

Release
Hanna D. was released as Angel in the Dark on home video in Germany on October 1988.

Reception
In the German Fischer film almanach from 1989, the review described the film as strictly based on "voyeurism" opposed to any enlightenment about the Hannah's plight.

See also
 List of Italian films of 1984
 List of French films of 1984

References

Sources

External links
 

1984 films
1980s Italian-language films
Italian erotic drama films
1980s erotic drama films
1984 drama films
1980s Italian films